Sarijalu (also Romanized as Sārījālū; also known as Sardzhalu, Sārejlū, Sārījlū, Sārījollū, Sārījolū, and Sārjalū) is a village in Guzal Darreh Rural District, Soltaniyeh District, Abhar County, Zanjan Province, Iran. At the 2006 census, its population was 451, in 115 families.

References 

Populated places in Abhar County